Pycnocraspedum is a genus of cusk-eels.

Species
There are currently five recognized species in this genus:
 Pycnocraspedum armatum Gosline, 1954
 Pycnocraspedum fulvum Machida, 1984
 Pycnocraspedum microlepis (Matsubara, 1943)
 Pycnocraspedum phyllosoma (A. E. Parr, 1933) 
 Pycnocraspedum squamipinne Alcock, 1889 (Pelagic cusk)

References

Ophidiidae